Potamanthus luteus is a species of hacklegilled burrower mayfly in the family Potamanthidae. It is or was found principally on the Rivers Usk and Wye in the UK; in the Usk it may have become extinct and in the Wye it has suffered a population crash.

References

Further reading

External links

 

Mayflies
Insects described in 1767
Taxa named by Carl Linnaeus